Emma Reyes (July 9, 1919 – July 12, 2003) was a realism painter and writer from Bogota, Colombia. Reyes was considered the "godmother" of Latin American art for the portrayals of her life struggles in her paintings. She was encouraged to write by the Colombian author Gabriel Garcia Marquez. Those who knew her paintings described them as very old and very few.

Reyes is known for her book The Book of Emma Reyes: A Memoir.

Biography 
Emma Reyes was born in 1919 in Bogota.  When she was about 6 or 7 years old, her mother abandoned her. Reyes and her sister were sent to a convent.  While at the convent, Reyes was not allowed to socialize with the outside world. 

At age 19, Reyes was able to leave the convent. She got married and had a child. Her child was later killed during a home invasion. Reyes soon fled to Paris to begin here her life of painting. In 1943 she received a scholarship to study in Paris.

Reyes died on July 12, 2003 at age 84.

Career 
Much of Reyes' artwork draws on her life and the obstacles that she faced living in poverty. Despite the cruelty Reyes experienced in her childhood, she still tried to send positive messages through her works by making colorful images associated with animals and plants.

Reyes never received an education and was considered "illiterate." Nevertheless, she wrote letters and put them together as a book. She was mainly known for her writing rather than her paintings.

Works 
Many of Reyes' paintings were unnamed.  Instead, they were distinguished by what they represented. Most of her early works was a representation of the life she had left behind.

"Unknown (Goat)"
Reyes utilized vibrant colors and painted mainly plants and animals. Her goal was to use vibrant colors in order to represent her personality. Her paintings such as this one, was done by color pencils and a board. The background of this painting is a pastel yellow with pastel green grass while there's a white cow drinking milk from a blue bucket.

"Figurine"
This painting portrays a human figure build from garbage that implies children's imagination, but then destroyed by the evil in this world.

"Burning Villages"
In this painting Reyes intended to show loneliness in a town that's corrupted surrounded by economy issues, cruelty, and abandonment. It represents the struggle Reyes and her sister faced.

Most of Emma Reyes works are held in the Essex Collection of Art from Latin America. Her work is also preserved at the Museum of Art and Archeology of Périgord.

Publications 
Before publishing her book The Book of Emma Reyes: A Memoir, Reyes didn't want any changes in her grammar. Since she didn't get an education, the errors in her writing represent the struggle she went through writing the book and in addition relating to the struggles she survived in her childhood such as poverty. The book consist of 23 letters as the only format she was capable of writing. The dates of the letters start from 1969- 1997. It was known that Reyes had a difficult time organizing her thoughts when it came to writing. Luckily, her solution was writing letters. The first letter of the book opens up with the most obvious, her childhood from there leading to her life.

Bibliography 
 Fajardo-Hill, Cecilia, et al. Radical Women: Latin American Art, 1960-1985. Hammer Museum, University of California, 2017.
 Reyes, Emma, and Daniel Alarcon (2017). The Book oƒ Emma Reyes. Penguin Books.
 The Radical Women Manifesto: Socialist Feminist Theory, Program and Organizational Structure. Red Letter Press, 2001.

References 

1919 births
2003 deaths
20th-century Colombian women artists
People from Bogotá
Colombian expatriates in France